Moni Power Station is the second power plant the Electricity Authority of Cyprus built. Construction started in the 1960s and when completed it consisted of six steam turbogenerators each having a capacity of 30MW. Heavy fuel oil was fired in all boilers. One generator has been decommissioned in early, while the other five are now rated at 25MW and are in storage as of early 2012.

In the late 1980s, four gas turbines using distillate fuel oil no. 2 (usually called "diesel" or "gasoil") were added and now rated at 35 MW each.

See also

 Energy in Cyprus

Oil-fired power stations in Cyprus